Alexi Jaimes (born August 4, 1997) is an American soccer player.

Career 
Jaimes played college soccer at Salt Lake Community College between 2016 and 2017, helping lead the team to a top-10 national ranking, scoring 7 goals and tallying 2 assists in 33 appearances for the Bruins.

Jaimes played in 2018 with USL PDL side Ogden City and again in the PDL in 2019, now re-branded as USL League Two, with Park City Red Wolves. However, he was only with Park City for 12 days, before earning a trial at the club's USL League One parent team Chattanooga Red Wolves. Jaimes signed a professional contract with Chattanooga on May 17, 2019.

References

External links
 
 

1997 births
Living people
American soccer players
Association football forwards
Chattanooga Red Wolves SC players
Soccer players from Anaheim, California
USL League One players
USL League Two players
Salt Lake Bruins men's soccer players